The buildings and architecture of Chicago reflect the city's history and multicultural heritage, featuring prominent buildings in a variety of styles. Most structures downtown were destroyed by the Great Chicago Fire in 1871 (an exception being the Water Tower).

Chicago's architectural styles include Chicago Bungalows, Two-Flats, and Graystones along Logan Boulevard and Lawndale Avenue. The Loop is home to skyscrapers as well as sacred architecture including "Polish Cathedrals". Chicago is home to one of the largest and most diverse collections of skyscrapers in the world.

Skyscrapers

Beginning in the early 1880s, architectural pioneers of the Chicago School explored steel-frame construction and, in the 1890s, the use of large areas of plate glass. These were among the first modern skyscrapers. William LeBaron Jenney's Home Insurance Building was completed in 1885 and is considered to be the first to use steel in its structural frame instead of cast iron. However, this building was still clad in heavy brick and stone. The Montauk Building, designed by John Wellborn Root Sr. and Daniel Burnham, was built from 1882 to 1883 using structural steel. Daniel Burnham and his partners, John Welborn Root and Charles B. Atwood, designed technically advanced steel frames with glass and terra cotta skins in the mid-1890s, in particular the Reliance Building; these were made possible by professional engineers, in particular E. C. Shankland, and modern contractors, in particular George A. Fuller.

Louis Sullivan discarded historical precedent and designed buildings that emphasized their vertical nature. This new form of architecture, by Jenney, Burnham, Sullivan, and others, became known as the "Commercial Style," but was called the "Chicago School" by later historians.

In 1892, the Masonic Temple surpassed the New York World Building, breaking its two-year reign as the tallest skyscraper, only to be surpassed itself two years later by another New York building.

Since 1963, a "Second Chicago School" has emerged from the work of Ludwig Mies van der Rohe at the Illinois Institute of Technology in Chicago. The ideas of structural engineer Fazlur Khan were also influential in this movement, in particular his introduction of a new structural system of framed tubes in skyscraper design and construction. The first building to apply the tube-frame construction was the DeWitt-Chestnut Apartment Building which Khan designed and was completed in Chicago by 1966. This laid the foundations for the tube structures of many other later skyscrapers, including his own constructions of the John Hancock Center and Willis Tower (then named the Sears Tower) in Chicago and can be seen in the construction of the World Trade Center, Petronas Towers, Jin Mao Building, and most other supertall skyscrapers since the 1960s. Willis Tower would be the world's tallest building from its construction in 1974 until 1998 (when the Petronas Towers was built) and would remain the tallest for some categories of buildings until the Burj Khalifa was completed in early 2010.

Landmarks, monuments and public places

Numerous architects have constructed landmark buildings of varying styles in Chicago. Among them are the so-called "Chicago seven":  James Ingo Freed, Tom Beeby, Larry Booth, Stuart Cohen, James Nagle, Stanley Tigerman, and Ben Weese.
Daniel Burnham led the design of the "White City" of the 1893 World's Columbian Exposition which some historians claim led to a revival of Neo-Classical architecture throughout Chicago and the entire United States. Burnham developed the 1909 "Plan for Chicago" in a Neo-Classical style, although many skyscrapers were built after the Exposition closed, between 1894 and 1899. Louis Sullivan said that the fair set the course of American architecture back by two decades, but his work the Schlesinger and Meyer (later Carson, Pirie, Scott) store was built in 1899—five years after the "White City" and ten years before Burnham's Plan.

Erik Larson's history of the Columbian Exposition, The Devil in the White City, says that the building techniques developed during the construction of the many buildings of the fair were entirely modern, even if they were adorned in a way Sullivan found aesthetically distasteful.

Chicago's public art includes outdoor works by Chagall, Picasso, Miró and Abakanowicz.

City sculptures additionally honor people and topics from the history of Chicago. There are monuments to:

 Tadeusz Kościuszko by Kazimierz Chodzinski
 Nicholas Copernicus by Bertel Thorvaldsen
 Karel Havlíček Borovský by Joseph Strachovsky
 Pope John Paul II, several different monuments (including by Czesław Dźwigaj)
 Tomáš Garrigue Masaryk by Albin Polasek
 Irv Kupcinet by Preston Eugene Jackson
 Abraham Lincoln by Augustus Saint Gaudens
 The Heald Square Monument featuring George Washington, Haym Salomon, and Robert Morris by Lorado Taft, (completed by Leonard Crunelle)
 Christopher Columbus by Carl Brioschi
 General John A. Logan by Augustus Saint Gaudens
 Harry Caray by Omri Amrany and Lou Cella
 Jack Brickhouse by Jerry McKenna
 A memorial to the Haymarket affair by Mary Brogger
 A memorial to the Great Northern Migration by Alison Saar

There are also plans to erect a 1:1-scale replica of Wacław Szymanowski's statue of Frédéric Chopin along Chicago's lakefront. in addition to a different sculpture commemorating the artist in Chopin Park.

In the 21st century, Chicago has become an urban focus for landscape architecture and the architecture of public places. 19th-20th century Chicago architects included Burnham, Frederick Olmsted, Jens Jensen and Alfred Caldwell, modern projects include Millennium Park, Northerly Island, the 606, the Chicago Riverwalk, Maggie Daley Park, and proposals in Jackson Park.

Residential architecture
Frank Lloyd Wright's Prairie School influenced both building design and the design of furnishings.  In the early half of the 20th century, popular residential neighborhoods were developed with Chicago Bungalow style houses, many of which still exist. The two-flat apartment building, along with the larger three- and six-flat buildings, make up 30% of Chicago's housing stock. A two-flat includes two apartments, each of which occupies a full floor, usually with a large bay window and with a grey stone or red brick facade. The apartments typically have the same layout with a large living and dining room area at the front, the kitchen at the back and the bedrooms running down one side of the unit.

Ludwig Mies van der Rohe's Illinois Institute of Technology campus in Chicago influenced the later Modern or International style. Van der Rohe's work is sometimes called the Second Chicago School.

Preservation
Many organizations, including Preservation Chicago and Landmarks Illinois, promote the preservation of historic neighborhoods and buildings in Chicago.  Chicago has suffered from the same problems with sinking property values and urban decline as other major cities.  Many historic structures have been threatened with demolition.

Timeline of notable buildings
1836–1900
 1836 Henry B. Clarke House
 1869 Chicago Water Tower, William W. Boyington
 1874 Second Presbyterian Church 1936 S. Michigan, James Renwick 1900 Howard Van Doren Shaw
 1877 St. Stanislaus Kostka Church 1327 N. Noble, Patrick Keely
 1882–1883 Montauk Building, Daniel Burnham and John Wellborn Root.  First building to be called a "skyscraper." (Demolished, 1902)
 1885 Home Insurance Building, Chicago School, William Le Baron Jenney (Demolished, 1931)
 1885 Palmer Mansion, early Romanesque and Norman Gothic, Henry Ives Cobb and Charles Sumner Frost (Demolished, 1950)
 1886 John J. Glessner House, Henry Hobson Richardson 
 1887 Marshall Field Warehouse, Henry Hobson Richardson (Demolished, 1930)
 1888 Rookery Building, Daniel Burnham and John Wellborn Root, 1905 lobby redesign by Frank Lloyd Wright 
 1889 Monadnock Building, Daniel Burnham and John Wellborn Root
 1889 Auditorium Building, Louis Sullivan and Dankmar Adler.
 1889 St. Mary of Perpetual Help Church, Henry Engelbert
 1890 and 1894–1895 Reliance Building, Charles B. Atwood of Burnham & Root
 1890–1899 Gage Group Buildings, Holabird & Roche with Louis Sullivan
 1891 Manhattan Building, William Le Baron Jenney
 1892 Masonic Temple, Daniel Burnham and John Wellborn Root (Demolished, 1939)
 1892–1893 World's Columbian Exposition, Daniel Burnham, director of Works
 1893 Palace of Fine Arts, later Museum of Science and Industry, Beaux-Arts, Charles B. Atwood
 1893-1898 St. John Cantius Church, Alphonsus Druiding
 1894 Tree Studio Building and Annexes, Judge Lambert & Anne Tree via Parfitt Brothers; 1912 annex: Hill and Woltersdorf
 1895–1896 Fisher Building (Chicago), D.H. Burnham & Company, Charles B. Atwood
 1897 St. Paul Church 2234 S. Hoyne, Henry Schlacks
 1897 Chicago Library (now Chicago Cultural Center), Shepley, Rutan and Coolidge
 1899 Sullivan Center, Louis Sullivan; 1905–1906, twelve-story south addition, D.H. Burnham & Company

1900-1939:
 1902 Marshall Field and Company Building, north State Street building D.H. Burnham & Company, Charles B. Atwood
 1903 Holy Trinity Cathedral, Chicago
 1905-1906 Holy Trinity Polish Mission, Herman Olszewski and William G. Krieg,
 1905 Chicago Federal Building, Henry Ives Cobb
 1906 Sears Merchandise Building Tower, George G. Nimmons - William K. Fellows
 1907 Marshall Field and Company Building, south State Street building D.H. Burnham & Company, Charles B. Atwood
 1909 Robie House, Prairie School, Frank Lloyd Wright
 1910-1911 Eighth Church of Christ, Scientist, Leon E. Stanhope. Designated a Chicago Landmark on June 9, 1993.
 1912-1914 St. Adalbert's Church 1650 W.17th street, Henry Schlacks
 1912 Medinah Temple North Wabash Avenue
 1912 Pulaski Park fieldhouse by Jens Jensen
 1914 Navy Pier
 1914-1920 St. Mary of the Angels Church 1850 N. Hermitage Ave, Worthmann and Steinbach
 1915 Holy Cross Church, Joseph Molitor
 1916 Navy Pier Auditorium, Charles Sumner Frost
 1917–1920 Michigan Avenue Bridge, Edward H. Bennett
 1917-1921 Basilica of St. Hyacinth 3636 West Wolfram Avenue, Worthmann & Steinbach
 1919-1924 Wrigley Building, Graham, Anderson, Probst & White
 1921 Chicago Theatre, Beaux-Arts, Cornelius W. Rapp and George L. Rapp
 1921 Old Chicago Main Post Office, Graham, Anderson, Probst & White
 1922 Tribune Tower, neo-Gothic, John Mead Howells and Raymond M. Hood
 1924 Soldier Field, Holabird & Roche; extensive renovation 2003, Ben Wood and Carlos Zapata
 1925 Uptown Theatre, Cornelius W. Rapp and George L. Rapp
 1927 Pittsfield Building, Graham, Anderson, Probst and White
 1929 Carbide & Carbon Building, Daniel and Hubert Burnham, sons of Daniel Burnham
 1929 Palmolive Building, Art Deco, Holabird & Root
 1929 John G. Shedd Aquarium, Graham, Anderson, Probst & White
 1930 Chicago Board of Trade Building, Holabird & Root
 1930 All Saints Cathedral, J. G. Steinbach
 1930 Gateway Theatre Mason Rapp of Rapp & Rapp; extensive renovation 1979 to 1984, "Solidarity Tower" addition in 1985
 1930 Adler Planetarium & Astronomy Museum, Ernest A. Grunsfeld, Jr.
 1931 Merchandise Mart, Graham, Anderson, Probst & White
 1930s-1960s Illinois Institute of Technology, including S.R. Crown Hall, Second Chicago School, Ludwig Mies van der Rohe and Skidmore, Owings & Merrill
 1934 Field Building, Graham, Anderson, Probst & White

1940 to the present:
 1940-1942 St. Wenceslaus church, 3400 N. Monticello Ave, McCarthy, Smith and Eppig
 1952 860–880 Lake Shore Drive, Ludwig Mies van der Rohe
 1957 Inland Steel Building, Bruce Graham and Walter Netsch, Skidmore, Owings & Merrill,
 1964 Marina City, Bertrand Goldberg
 1968 Lake Point Tower, John Heinrich and George Schipporeit
 1968 Seventeenth Church of Christ, Scientist. Harry Weese
 1969 John Hancock Center, Bruce Graham, Skidmore, Owings & Merrill
 1973 330 North Wabash, Ludwig Mies van der Rohe
 1974 Willis Tower, Bruce Graham, Skidmore, Owings & Merrill (previously the Sears Tower)
 1974 Aon Center, Edward Durrell Stone (earlier names were Standard Oil Building and Amoco Building)
 1977 St. Joseph the Betrothed Ukrainian Greek Catholic Church
 1979-85 James R. Thompson Center, Helmut Jahn
 1989 NBC Tower, Skidmore, Owings & Merrill
 1990 American Medical Association Building, Kenzo Tange
 1990 Athletic Club Illinois Center, Kisho Kurokawa
 1991 Harold Washington Library Center, Thomas Beeby
 1991 Guaranteed Rate Field, Home of the White Sox
 1991 Museum of Contemporary Art, Josef Paul Kleihues
 1992 77 West Wacker Drive, Ricardo Bofill
 2004 Millennium Park, Frank Gehry, Kathryn Gustafson, Anish Kapoor, Jaume Plensa, and others, a showcase for 21st century modernism.
 2009 155 North Wacker, Goettsch Partners
 2009 Trump International Hotel and Tower, Skidmore, Owings & Merrill
 2010 Aqua Tower, Studio Gang Architects
 2019 NEMA, Rafael Viñoly Architects
 2019 One Bennett Park, Robert A.M. Stern Architects
 2020 110 North Wacker, Goettsch Partners
 2021 St. Regis Chicago, Studio Gang Architects

Styles and schools

Chicago architects used many design styles and belonged to a variety of architectural schools.  Below is a list of those styles and schools.

American Four-Square
Art Deco/Moderne
Art Nouveau
Arts & Crafts
Chateauesque
Chicago School (Also called Commercial Style)
City Beautiful
Classical Revival (also known as Neoclassical architecture)
Colonial Revival
Craftsman (also known as American Craftsman)
Dutch Colonial
Eastlake/Stick
Edwardian architecture
Gothic Revival
Greek Revival
International (sometimes called Second Chicago School)
Italianate
Middle Eastern
Modern
Oriental
Postmodern
Prairie School
Queen Anne
Renaissance Revival also known as Neo-Renaissance
Romanesque Revival also known as Neo-Romanesque
Second Empire
Spanish Revival also known as Spanish Colonial Revival
Sullivanesque (for style elements and examples see Louis Sullivan)
Tudor Revival
Workers Cottage

Buildings - a "Top Forty" List

In 2010, Chicago Magazine selected 40 still existing properties for their historical and architectural importance, opening an on-line forum for debate.  The top ten chosen were:

1: John Hancock Center, 875 N. Michigan Ave. (1969)
2: Rookery Building, 209 S. LaSalle St. (1885–1888)
3: 860-880 Lake Shore Drive Apartments, (1952)
4: Monadnock Building, 53 W. Jackson Blvd. (1891 and 1893)
5: Carson, Pirie, Scott and Company Building, 1 S. State St. (1899)
6: S. R. Crown Hall, 3360 S. State St. (1956)
7: Auditorium Building, 430 S. Michigan Ave. (1889)
8: Frederick C. Robie House, 5757 S. Woodlawn Ave. (1909)
9: Farnsworth House (Plano, Illinois), 14520 River Rd., Plano, IL (1951)
10: Sears Tower (now the Willis Tower), 233 S. Wacker Dr. (1974)

See also

Chicago Architecture Foundation
Inside Chicago Walking Tours
Chicago Architecture Biennial
Chicago Loop
Chicago neighborhoods
Landmarks of Chicago
List of tallest buildings in Chicago
Parks of Chicago
Polish Cathedral style
Visual arts of Chicago

Notes

References

Further reading
 Pridmore, Jay and George A. Larson, Chicago Architecture and Design : Revised and expanded, Harry N. Abrams, Inc., New York, 2005. .

External links

 Online tour of designated Chicago landmarks
 Walking architectural tours of Chicago
 Information on several major Chicago buildings
 Chicago Church Architecture
 American Institute of Architects
 Chicago Architects Project - Society of Architectural Historians